Meditations (also released as Elmo Hope Memorial Album) is an album by American jazz pianist Elmo Hope recorded in 1955 for the Prestige label.

Reception

The Allmusic review by Scott Yanow stated: "Fans of bop piano and Bud Powell will want this enjoyable CD reissue".

Track listing
All compositions by Elmo Hope, except as indicated
 "It's a Lovely Day Today" (Irving Berlin) - 2:56
 "All the Things You Are" (Oscar Hammerstein II, Jerome Kern) - 3:38
 "Quit It" - 2:53
 "Lucky Strike" - 2:38
 "I Don't Stand a Ghost of a Chance with You" (Bing Crosby, Ned Washington, Victor Young) - 3:22
 "Huh" - 4:55
 "Falling in Love with Love" (Lorenz Hart, Richard Rodgers) - 4:24
 "My Heart Stood Still" (Hart, Rodgers) - 3:46
 "Elmo's Fire" - 6:40
 "I'm in the Mood for Love" (Dorothy Fields, Jimmy McHugh) - 3:22
 "Blue Mo" - 4:24

Personnel 
Elmo Hope - piano
John Ore - bass
Willie Jones - drums

References 

1955 albums
Albums produced by Bob Weinstock
Albums recorded at Van Gelder Studio
Prestige Records albums
Elmo Hope albums